Klaus Enrique /ˈklaʊs ɛnˈriːke/ (born 1975) is a Mexican-German post-contemporary sculptor and photographer known for his recreations of portraits by Italian painter Giuseppe Arcimboldo.

Early life
Enrique grew up in Mexico City. He studied genetics at the University of Nottingham, England, and received an MBA from Columbia Business School in New York City.

Photography
Enrique was a freelance IT consultant before he turned to photography, which he studied at Parsons and at the School of Visual Arts. His portrait of Mother & Daughter was considered for the Photographic Portrait Prize at London's National Portrait Gallery. Subsequently, he has been nominated and short listed for various awards.

In 2011, Enrique won the Curator Award / Emerging Artist of the Year for Still Photography. and in 2013, his "Vertumnus" was included in The History of Still Life in Ten Masterpieces as the Tenth Masterpiece, alongside works by Cézanne, Goya, and Warhol. His work is in the permanent collection of the Museum of Fine Arts Houston, the Leslie/Lohman Museum and the Haggerty Museum of Art.

References

External links
 

1975 births
Mexican artists
People from Mexico City
Columbia Business School alumni
Living people